Life is a lost 1920 American silent drama film directed by Travers Vale and written by William A. Brady based upon the play Life by Thompson Buchanan. The film stars Nita Naldi, Hubert Druce, Jack Mower, J.H. Gilmour, Arline Pretty, and Leeward Meeker. The film was released on November 13, 1920, by Paramount Pictures.

Plot
As described in a film magazine, the film starts with an 8-oar shell race between college teams. Later, there is a prison escape from Sing Sing, and then a murder on the steps of St. Patrick's Cathedral on Fifth Avenue in New York City (filmed at the actual cathedral while the congregation was leaving mass). A priest and crowd gather around the dying man, and the priest takes his confession. There are several plot twists.

Cast
Nita Naldi	as Grace Andrews
Hubert Druce as Tom Andrews
Jack Mower as Bill Reid
J.H. Gilmour as William Stuyvesant 
Arline Pretty as Ruth Stuyvesant
Leeward Meeker as Ralph Stuyvesant
Rod La Rocque as Tom Burnett
Edwin Stanley as Dennis O'Brien
Curtis Cooksey as 'Bull' Anderson
Geoffrey Stein as 'Dutch' Joe Schmidt
Effingham Pinto as Monsignor Henri

References

External links 

 

1920 films
1920s English-language films
Silent American drama films
1920 drama films
Paramount Pictures films
American black-and-white films
Lost American films
American silent feature films
World Film Company films
1920 lost films
Lost drama films
Films directed by Travers Vale
1920s American films